The governor of Mississippi is the head of state and head of government of Mississippi and the commander-in-chief of the state's military forces. The governor has a duty to enforce state laws, and the power to either approve or veto bills passed by the Mississippi Legislature, to convene the legislature at any time, and, except in cases of treason or impeachment, to grant pardons and reprieves.

To be elected governor, a person must be at least 30 years old, and must have been a citizen of the United States for twenty years and a resident of Mississippi for at least five years at the time of inauguration. The Constitution of Mississippi, ratified in 1890, calls for a four-year term for the governor, elected via the two-round system since a 2020 referendum. Prior to this, the governor was elected by an electoral college composed of the districts represented in the Mississippi House of Representatives, with a contingent election held in the House in the event no candidate received a majority of district electors. The governor may be reelected once (prior to a 1987 amendment to the state Constitution, governors were limited to one term). The original Constitution of 1817 had only a two-year term for governor; this was expanded to four years in the 1868 Constitution. The lieutenant governor is elected at the same time as the governor and serves as president of the Mississippi Senate. When the office of governor becomes vacant for any reason, the lieutenant governor becomes governor for the remainder of the term.

The governor of Mississippi also appoints the members of the Institutions of Higher Learning Board of Trustees.

Qualifications
Anyone who seeks to be elected Governor of Mississippi must meet the following qualifications:
Be at least 30 years old
Be a citizen of the United States for 20 years
Be a resident of the state for 5 years

History
The 1890 constitution barred the governor from seeking successive terms and established an electoral college system for selecting the governor and other officials, a move meant to ensure white control of state politics. The constitution also gave the governor line-item veto power over appropriations bills.

Since Mississippi became a U.S. state, it has had 54 governors serving 64 distinct terms, including 50 Democrats, 7 Republicans and 7 from other parties. Democrats dominated after retaking control of the state legislature; they passed a Constitution in 1890 that disenfranchised most African Americans, excluding them from the political system for nearly 70 years, effectively making it a one-party state. The state's longest-serving governor was John M. Stone, who served two terms over ten years (his second term was extended to six years by a transitional provision in the 1890 Constitution). The shortest-serving governor was James Whitfield, who served  months from 1851 to 1852. 10 governors (David Holmes, Gerard Brandon, Charles Lynch, John A. Quitman, John J. Pettus, Adelbert Ames, John Marshall Stone, Theodore G. Bilbo, Dennis Murphree, and Hugh L. White) have served non-consecutive terms. The current governor is Republican Tate Reeves, who took office January 14, 2020.

Office structure 
The governor maintains a part-time office in the Mississippi State Capitol in Jackson.

Governors of the Territory of Mississippi (1798–1817) 
 Prior to the Compact of 1802, parts of what is now Mississippi were claimed by the state of Georgia; see List of governors of Georgia for this period.
 Prior to 1813, the panhandle of Mississippi was part of the Mobile District of the Spanish territory of West Florida; see List of Colonial Governors of Florida.

 Political parties

Governors of the U.S. state of Mississippi 
 Political parties

Succession

See also
Mississippi
List of lieutenant governors of Mississippi

Notes

References
General

 
"Governor Haley Barbour." State of Mississippi. Retrieved September 5, 2009.
"." National Governors Association. Retrieved September 5, 2009.

Constitutions

"Constitution of the State of Mississippi" (current, 1890 with amendments). Mississippi Secretary of State (Education and Publications). Retrieved September 5, 2009.
"Constitution of the State of Mississippi" (1890). Mississippi History Now. Retrieved September 5, 2009.
"Constitution of the State of Mississippi" (1868). Mississippi History Now. Retrieved September 5, 2009.
"Constitution of the State of Mississippi" (1832). Mississippi History Now. Retrieved September 5, 2009.
"Constitution of the State of Mississippi" (1817). Mississippi History Now. Retrieved September 5, 2009.

Specific

 
Governor
Mississippi